Daniel Joseph Manucci (born September 3, 1957) is a former American football quarterback and sports radio personality.

Manucci played his short National Football League career as a backup for the Buffalo Bills in the early 1980s, and returned to the team in 1987 during the player's strike, playing as a replacement player. He also played for the Canadian Football League's Toronto Argonauts (1981) and the United States Football League's Arizona Wranglers (1983)

He is currently co-host of the sports radio talk show "Roc and Manuch;" a daily local show on KGME in Phoenix, Arizona.

References

1957 births
Living people
American football quarterbacks
Canadian football quarterbacks
Arizona Wranglers players
American players of Canadian football
Buffalo Bills players
Kansas State Wildcats football players
Toronto Argonauts players
Sportspeople from Erie, Pennsylvania
Players of American football from Pennsylvania